Arcesine or Arkesine, also known as Arcaseia or Arkaseia (Ἀρκέσεια or Ἀρκέσσεια), was a town of ancient Greece on the island of Karpathos. Its name is only preserved in an inscription containing the tribute of the Athenian allies. The site of Arcesine was identified by Ludwig Ross as the modern Arkasa, situated upon a promontory in the middle of the west coast of the southern part of the island.

References

Populated places in the ancient Aegean islands
Former populated places in Greece